Samuel Merner (9 January 1823 – 11 August 1908) was a Canadian businessman and politician.

Born in Kien, Canton of Bern, Switzerland, with the last name of Muerner or Mürner, he immigrated to Canada with his parents in 1837 settling in Waterloo County, Ontario. He later anglicized his last name to Merner.

A businessman, his career in politics started in 1857 when he became a member of the council of the village of New Hamburg, Ontario. From 1873 to 1878, he was reeve of New Hamburg and served as Warden of Waterloo County in 1878. After losing a by-election in 1878 in the Ontario provincial riding of Waterloo South, he was elected to the House of Commons of Canada in the federal riding of Waterloo South in the 1878 federal election. A Conservative, he was defeated in the 1882 election but was appointed to the Senate in 1887 representing the senatorial division of Hamburg, Ontario. He served until his death in 1908.

Electoral record

References

External links
 

1823 births
1908 deaths
Canadian senators from Ontario
Conservative Party of Canada (1867–1942) MPs
Conservative Party of Canada (1867–1942) senators
Members of the House of Commons of Canada from Ontario
People from the Regional Municipality of Waterloo
Canadian people of Swiss-German descent
Swiss emigrants to pre-Confederation Ontario
Mayors of places in Ontario
Immigrants to Upper Canada